The Great Western Railway was a British railway company that linked London with the Midlands, the south-west and west of England and most of Wales. In 1930 it introduced 100 containers primarily for building materials.

Specifications 

Details include:

 Width:  (internal )
 Length:  (internal )
 Height:  (internal )
 Tare: 
 Load:

See also 

 Containerization
 Intermodal container

References 

Containers
Great Western Railway